The Gaelic King is a 2017 British historical fantasy film, set in the Scottish dark ages. It stars Jake McGarry in the lead role, with Philip Todd directing.

Plot 
From Amazon UK:

"Set in the war-torn dark ages of 800AD Scotland, this is the story of a young Warrior-King named Alpin. When his family is murdered by a rival Pict King, Alpin and his infant brother Finn, are the sole escapees. Alpin swears to one day return, seeking vengeance and regain his rightful claim to the throne.

Ten years later Alpin and Finn, return and come across a community whose children are being kidnapped by the mysterious dark 'Shadow Warriors'. When Finn gets captured, Alpin sets out to rescue him, accompanied by a Druid-monk called Lachlan. What ensues is a gripping adventure, culminating in a final epic battle between Alpin and Nathara, the sorceress who awoke and controls the Shadow Warriors."

Cast 
 Jake McGarry as Alpin
 Noah Irvine as Finn
 Daniel Todd as Baby Finn
 Shona Melrose as Edana, the Pictish princess who helps Alpin
 Kerry Browne as The Sorceress, Nathara
 Laurence Whitley as Lachlan, an eccentric druid-priest
 Peter Cosgrove as Fergus, the leader of the Pictish tribe
 Ellie Reid as Sinead, daughter of Lachlan and Biddy
 Alan Cuthbert as Torcall, leader of the villagers
 Eve Wengel as Kyra
 Simon DeSilva as King Unust, Edana's father
 Alasdair Blair as King Eachdach, Alpin's father
 David Richardson as King Conall
 Olivia Easton as Kidnapped Child
 Kyle Wallace as Gart, one of the Pictish war-band
 Fiona Stewart as Biddy, Lachlan's wife
 Rhona Fleming as Alpin's Mother
 Chris Watt as Vind, a Pict warrior
 Tony Fuggle as Dunadd Gael
 Scott Iain Robertson as Nechtan
 Alistair Wales as Ciar

Production

Funding 
The second block of filming was largely crowdfunded by a successful Indiegogo campaign, which raised over £8,000.

Filming 
Filming took place in Scotland over 3 blocks between 2015-16. Main locations were Stirling and the Cairngorms. As part of the production, a full scale dark age village was constructed, with help from the local communities.

Release 
The Gaelic King was released in the UK on 10 July 2017.

Home media 
The Gaelic King was released on DVD in the UK on 10 July 2017 online and in high street retailers such as HMV.

Soundtrack 
 Hope is Coming - Performed by Kerrie Finlay and Stephen Chalk

References

External links 
 

British fantasy films
British action films
2010s English-language films
2010s British films